The following highways are numbered 674:

Canada
Alberta Highway 674
Saskatchewan Highway 674

England
A674 Chorley to Blackburn

Philippines
 N674 highway (Philippines)

United States 
 
 
 
 
 
 
Virginia:
 Virginia State Route 674 (Fairfax County)
 Virginia State Route 674 (Prince William County)